The Danish Music Awards (DMA) is a Danish award show. The show has been arranged by IFPI since 1989, and was originally called IFPI-prisen ("IFPI-Award") until 1991, when it changed its name to Dansk Grammy ("Danish Grammy"). It was changed to its current name, Danish Music Awards in 2001, after the American Grammy Awards registered the name "Grammy" as their trademark. In 2011, IFPI joined together with TV2 and KODA to present the awards ceremony.

IFPI Awards 1989
The 1989 Danish IFPI Awards were held on 25 February 1989 in K.B. Hallen, Frederiksberg.

IFPI Awards 1990
The 1990 Danish IFPI Awards were held on 25 February 1990 in K.B. Hallen, Frederiksberg to be replaced the following year by the Danish Grammy Awards that continued from 1991 until 2000.

Danish Grammy Awards
Award renamed in 1991.

Danish Grammy Awards 1991

Danish Grammy Awards (1992–1999)

Danish Grammy Awards 2000
2000 was the last year the awards were held under the title Danish Grammy Awards. After the American Grammy organization objecting, the show would be renamed Danish Music Awards starting 2001.

The last Danish "Grammies" were held on 5 February 2000 in the Forum, Frederiksberg. The show was broadcast live on TV 2, and was hosted by Casper Christensen and Krede.

Performances
Performances during the show included Det Brune Punktum, Clemens & Petter, Creamy, Marie Frank, Funkstar De Luxe, Hampenberg, Thomas Helmig, Juice, Kashmir, Poul Krebs, Melanie C, Ms Mukupa & Remee and Shirley, Zindy, Daniel, Jonas Winge Leisner, Kuku Agami & Mark Linn from soundtrack of the film Den eneste ene.

Starting 2001, the awards were held under the name Danish Music Awards after ten years as Danish Grammy Awards. The American Grammies management had protested the use of the name "Grammies" by the Danes and the Danish management was forced to bow to pressure and change the name from Danish Grammy Awards to Danish Music Awards.

Danish Music Awards 2001
The first ever Danish Music Awards under the new name was held on 3 March 2001 in the Forum, Frederiksberg. The inaugural "Danish Music Awards" show was broadcast live on TV 2, and was hosted by Casper Christensen and Lasse Rimmer.

The Winners

Performances
Performances during the show included Anastacia, Bliss, Tim Christensen, DJ Aligator, Erann DD, Filur, Karen, Manic Street Preachers, Outlandish, Rollo & King, Safri Duo, S.O.A.P., Superheroes and tv·2.

Danish Music Awards 2002
The 2002 Danish Music Awards were held on 2 March 2002 in the Forum, Frederiksberg. The show was broadcast live on TV 2, and was hosted by Lars Hjortshøj.

Performances
Performances during the show included Christian, EyeQ, Sort Sol, Thomas Helmig, DJ Encore, Hampenberg, Barcode Brothers, Westlife, D-A-D, Safri Duo, Swan Lee og Kylie Minogue.

Danish Music Awards 2003
The 2003 Danish Music Awards were held on 1 March 2003 in the Forum, Frederiksberg. The show was broadcast live on TV 2, and hosted by Timm Vladimir.

Performances
Live performances included Blue, Tim Christensen, Filur feat. Pernille Rosendahl, Junior Senior, Kashmir, Melanie C, Mew, Nik & Jay, Outlandish, Sanne Salomonsen and tv·2.

Danish Music Awards 2004
2004 Danish Music Awards was held on 28 February 2004 i the Forum, Frederiksberg. The show was broadcast live on TV 2, hosted by Timm Vladimir.

The Winners

Performances
The performances during the show included L.O.C., Kevin Lyttle, The Raveonettes, Swan Lee, Jokeren, Burhan G, Tim Christensen, Tue West, Erann DD, Bent Fabric and Blue.

Danish Music Awards 2005
2005 Danish Music Awards were held on 5 March 2005 in K.B. Hallen, Frederiksberg. The show was broadcast live on DR1, presented by Caroline Henderson and Thomas Madvig.

The Winners

Performances
Performances during the show included Nephew, D-A-D, Nik & Jay, Peter Sommer, Saybia, Allan Olsen, Junior Senior, Nobody Beats The Beats, Niarn, Clemens, Ataf and Kira & The Kindred Spirits.

Danish Music Awards 2006
The 2006 Danish Music Awards were held on 11 March 2006 in KB-Hallen, Frederiksberg. Show was broadcast live on DR1, and hosted by Jakob Riising.

The Winners

Performances
Performances during the show included Mew, Gavin DeGraw with DR's Big Band, Outlandish, Tina Dickow, Bikstok Røgsystem, Anna David, Johnny Deluxe, Carpark North, Tue West, Anders Matthesen and Kasper Eistrup.

Danish Music Awards 2007
The 2007 Danish Music Awards were held on 3 March 2007 in KB-Hallen, Frederiksberg. Show was broadcast live on DR1, and was hosted by Jakob Riising.

Performances
 Nik & Jay – "Boing!"
 Natasja – "Op med hovedet"
 Mikael Simpson – "Jeg sidder fast"
 Thomas Helmig featuring KNA Connected – "Det du kan"
 Ida Corr with DR Big Band – "Late Night Bimbo"
 Trolle//Siebenhaar – "Sweet Dogs"
 Nephew – "Igen & Igen &"
 Kenneth Bager – "The Sound of Swing"
 James Morrison med DR Big Band – Wonderful World
 VETO – "You Are A Knife"
 Rasmus Nøhr – "Sommer i Europa"

Danish Music Awards 2008
The 2008 Danish Music Awards were held on 23 February 2008 in Glassalen, Tivoli, Copenhagen and was hosted by Jan Gintberg.

The Winners

Performances
 Kiss Kiss Kiss – "Hector"
 Aura – "Are You for Sale", "Something from Nothing" og "Song for Sophie"
 Dúné – "80 Years" og "Bloodlines"
 Anne Linnet – "Glor på vinduer" (featuring Szhirley) og "Jeg ka' ik' sige nej til dig"
 Tina Dickow – "Cruel to the Sensitive Kind" og "On the Run"
 Volbeat – "Pool of Booze", "The Garden's Tale" (featuring Johan Olsen) og "Sad Man's Tongue"

Danish Music Awards 2009
The Winners

Performances
Performance by these artists:
 Sys Bjerre – "Sandpapir" and "Pik"
 Peter Sommer – "Til rotterne, til kragerne, til hundene" and "Chancetur"
 Mike Sheridan – "Krisehjælp" (featuring Nicolaj Rasted), "Too Close" (featuring Mads Langer) and "Fact-Fiction" (featuring Mads Langer).
 VETO – "Blackout" and "You Say Yes, I Say Yes"
 Balstyrko – "Intet stopper helt" and "Jagten paa noget"
 Love Shop – "Alle har en drøm at befri", "Love Goes On Forever" and "Kræmmersjæl"

Prizes were given in 22 categories of these are eight different musical genre from children's albums to electronica. 52 different artists or bands had 89 nominations at the Danish Music Awards 2009. More than 46% of the nominees are women or had women as their main artist. One fourth of the nominees were newcomers.

Danish Music Awards 2010 

Danish Music Awards 2010 was held at the Bremen Theatre in Copenhagen, Denmark on Sunday 14 November 2010. The host was songwriter and producer Søren Rasted. The show was not shown live on Danish TV. This was the first that the IFPI, World Music Denmark, Jazz Danmark and Folkemusikkens Fælles Sekretariat joined forces and made one joint music award event.

The awards were given to 20 different music categories. The prize Steppeulven for Hope of the Year was given by the Foreningen af Danske Musikkritikere (Association of Danish Music Critics).

The Winners

Danish Music Awards 2011 

The Winners

Danish Music Awards 2012 

The Winners

Nominations
Danish Album of the Year: Eaggerstunn – Armagedion, Lukas Graham – Lukas Graham, Malk De Koijn – Toback to the Fromtime, Oh Land – Oh Land, When Saints Go Machine – Konkylie.
Danish Band of the Year: Lukas Graham, Malk De Koijn, When Saints Go Machine.
Danish Female Artist of the Year: Aura Dione, Medina, Mette Lindberg (The Asteroids Galaxy Tour).
Danish Male Artist of the Year: L.O.C., Lukas Graham, Rasmus Seebach.
Danish Hit of the Year: Aura Dione – "Geronimo", Burhan G – "Jeg' i live", Medina – "Klokken 10", Rasmus Seebach – "I Mine Øjne", Svenstrup & Vendelboe feat. Nadia Malm – "Glemmer dig aldrig"
Danish Newcomer of the Year: Eaggerstunn, Lukas Graham, Ulige Numre.
Danish Songwriter of the Year: Aura Dione for Before the Dinosaurs, Jacob Bellens (I Got You On Tape) for Church of the Real, Lukas Graham & Backbone for Lukas Graham, Malk De Koijn for Toback to the Fromtime, Rasmus Seebach, Nicolai Seebach and Lars Ankerstjerne for Mer' end kærlighed.
Danish Producer of the Year: Andreas Keilgaard (Fresh-I), Søren Schou (Pharfar) and Shaka Loveless for Shaka Loveless' Tomgang, Eaggerstunn for Armagedion, When Saints Go Machine for Konkylie.
International Album of the Year: Black Keys – El Camino, Coldplay – Mylo Xyloto, Jack White – Blunderbuss, Jay-Z & Kanye West – Watch the Throne, Lana Del Rey – Born to Die.
International Hit of the Year: Avicii – "Levels", Carly Rae Jepsen – "Call Me Maybe", Gotye – "Somebody That I Used to Know", Michel Teló – "Ai Se Eu Te Pego", Rihanna – "We Found Love".
Danish Rock-album of the Year: D-A-D – Dic.Nii.Lan.Daft.Erd.Ark, Turboweekend – Fault Lines, Spleen United – School of Euphoria.
Danish Pop-album of the Year: Aura Dione – Before the Dinosaurs, Lukas Graham – Lukas Graham, Rasmus Seebach – Mer' end kærlighed.
Danish Urban-album of the Year: Eaggerstunn – Armagedion, L.O.C. – Prestige, Paranoia, Persona Vol. 1, Malk De Koijn – Toback to the Fromtime
Danish Voxpop-album: Mike Andersen – Mike Andersen, Sanne Salomonsen – Tiden Brænder, Sebastian – Øjeblikkets Mester.
Danish Club-album of the Year: Kasper Bjørke feat. Jacob Bellens – Lose Yourself to Jenny, Nabiha – Never Played the Bass, Shaka Loveless – Tomgang.
Danish Live Name of the Year: D-A-D, Malk De Koijn, L.O.C.
Danish Music Video of the Year: L.O.C. – "Langt Ude" (director: Mike Spooner), L.O.C. – "Noget Dumt" (director: Rasmus Laumann), Nabiha – "Never Played the Bass" (director: Patrick Killingbeck), Outlandish – "Warrior//Worrier" (director: Martin Skovbjerg /Sauna Cigar) and Shaka Loveless – "Tomgang" (director: Amdi Niss-Espinoza).
Audience Prize of the Year: Aura Dione, Medina, Shaka Loveless, Malk De Koijn, D-A-D, Niklas, Lukas Graham, L.O.C., Kato, Rasmus Seebach, Tim Christensen and the Damn Crystals, Klumben and Raske Penge.

Performances
Aura Dione – "In Love with the World"
Stine Bramsen – "Love Sea" (from the album Express Non-Stop)
Nabiha – "Mind the Gap"
Shaka Loveless – "Tomgang" and "Ikke mere tid"
Lukas Graham – "Better Than Yourself (Criminal Mind Pt. 2)"
Nephew – "Hjertestater"
Mads Langer – "Nu hvor du har brændt mig af" (from the album Vejen væk)
Outlandish – "Stupid Man"
Burhan G – "Midnat i Europa" (from the album 2)
Medina – "Har du glemt" (For altid (album))
EaggerStunn – "Kugledans"
Klumben & Raske Penge – "Faxe Kondi"
Marie Key – "Uopnåelig"
Dúné – "Hell No!"

Danish Music Awards 2013 

The Winners

Danish Music Awards 2014 

The Winners

Danish Music Awards 2015 

The Winners

Danish Music Awards 2017

Winners

Nominees

DMA-Academy 2017

Det Lille Akademi ("The Small Academy") 
Appoints the nominees:
 Hanne Boel - artist
 Henrik Daldorph - Sony Music
 Konrad Jahn - Universal Music
 Mikkel Torsting - Warner Music
 Søren Krogh Thompsen - Playground Music

Det Store Akademi ("The Large Academy") 
Appoints the winners by vote:
 Anne Sofie Jeramiassen - ArtPeople
 Jakob Sørensen - The Bank
 Jan-Erik Stig - Warner Music
 Karina Foss Fenn - Sony Music
 Lasse Lindorff - GL Music
 Louise Alenius - komponist
 Marie Key - artist
 Medina - artist
 Pelle Svindborg - YouSee Musik / Telmore Musik
 Peter Skovsted - PanAmericana
 Sira Berry - Spotify
 Thor Jensen - Apple Music
 Tobias Nielsen - Bauer Media
 Torben Ravn - Copenhagen Records
 Waqas Qadri - artist

References

Awards established in 1989
1989 establishments in Denmark
Danish music awards